Limones (Spanish for "lemons") may refer to:

An alternate name for Valdez, Esmeraldas, Ecuador
Limones, Chiriquí, Panama
Limones, Yabucoa, Puerto Rico, a barrio
Limones (footballer) (born 1986), Spanish footballer